Acetozone is an organic peroxide that is a strong oxidant.

In the early 20th century, it found use as a surgical antiseptic and for the treatment of typhoid fever.

It has also been used as a bleaching agent for flour.

References

Antiseptics
Organic peroxides